Rabbi Samuel M. Stahl (born August 25, 1939) is rabbi emeritus of Temple Beth-El (San Antonio, Texas) since 2002. Rabbi Stahl served the San Antonio, Texas Temple Beth-El for 26 years as its "Senior Rabbi." 
Previously, Rabbi Stahl served as a chaplain in the United States Army and as rabbi of Congregation B'nai Israel of Galveston, Texas.

Publications
In 1993, Rabbi Stahl wrote, Making the Timeless Timely: Thoughts and reflections of a contemporary reform rabbi and "Boundaries, Not Barriers: Some Uniquely Jewish Perspectives on Life."

Further reading
 Article on Jewish Texans by Rabbi Samuel M. Stahl
 Rabbi Stahl to present lectures at TLU
 Last November, Rabbi Samuel M. Stahl was worried that he might have prostate cancer
 Rabbi Samuel M. Stahl to Give Luncheon Lecture at Hebrew Union College – Jewish Institute of Religion

References

American Reform rabbis
Jews and Judaism in Galveston, Texas
Living people
1939 births
Rabbis in the military
United States Army chaplains
Rabbis from Texas
21st-century American Jews